The 35th UIT World Shooting Championships was the contemporary name of the ISSF World Shooting Championships in all ISSF shooting events held in Oslo, Norway, in 1952, only weeks before the 1952 Summer Olympics. It was the only World Shooting Championship between 1912 and 2008 to be conducted in an Olympic year.

Medal count

Rifle events

Pistol events

Shotgun events

Running target events

References

External links 
 All WCH medallists (ISSF website), which incorrectly gives 1950 as the year of this competition

ISSF World Shooting Championships
ISSF
S
1952 in Norwegian sport
1950s in Oslo
International sports competitions in Oslo
Shooting competitions in Norway